Dan Vlad (born Bucharest, 12 July 1983) is a Romanian rugby union footballer. He plays as a wing.

Vlad current team is Steaua București Rugby. He has 11 caps for Romania, since his debut in 2005 to 2008, with 2 conversions, 4 points in aggregate. He played a single match at the 2007 Rugby World Cup, in the narrow loss to Italy (18-24), which gave Romania a bonus point.

External links
Dan Vlad International Statistics

1983 births
Living people
Romanian rugby union players
Romania international rugby union players
Rugby union wings
Rugby union players from Bucharest
CSA Steaua București (rugby union) players